Paul Nebel (born 10 October 2002) is a German professional footballer who plays as a winger for  club Karlsruher SC, on loan from Mainz 05.

Career
Nebel made his debut for Mainz 05 in the first round of the 2020–21 DFB-Pokal on 11 September 2020, coming on as a substitute in the 60th minute for Levin Öztunalı against fourth-division side TSV Havelse. He assisted Jean-Philippe Mateta's 90th minute goal to complete a hat-trick, with the match finishing as a 5–1 win. He made his Bundesliga debut the following week on 20 September, coming on as a substitute for Mateta in the 90+1st minute of Mainz's away match against RB Leipzig, which finished as a 3–1 loss.

Personal life
Nebel was born in Germany, and is of Irish descent through his maternal grandmother. He is a youth international for Germany.

References

External links
 
 
 
 

2002 births
Living people
People from Bad Nauheim
Sportspeople from Darmstadt (region)
German people of Irish descent
German footballers
Footballers from Hesse
Association football wingers
Germany youth international footballers
1. FSV Mainz 05 players
1. FSV Mainz 05 II players
Karlsruher SC players
Bundesliga players
Regionalliga players